Gangseo-gu, or "west of river district," is the name of a gu in 2 South Korean cities:

Gangseo-gu, Busan
Gangseo-gu, Seoul

See also
Kangso-guyok, district of Nampo, North Korea